Éditions des Femmes is a French feminist publishing house that was launched in 1972, mainly by women of the collective Psychoanalysis and Politics led by Antoinette Fouque, with other activists of the MLF, and funded by the patron Sylvina Boissonnas. They offer works written by women, women focused issues related to human rights and women's empowerment, women's creativity and reflection, and also produce audio books.

History

The statutes of the SARL Women (a company composed of 21 members in equal parts) were filed in December 1972. The first manager was Yvonne Boissarie. Marie-Claude Grumbach (December 11, 1940 - 1 May 2001) succeeded in June 1974. In 1979, sales of shares are made in favor of members Fouque, Sylvina Boissonnas and Marie-Claude Grumbach, which "represents a significant change; the equality that was the basis of the LLC is broken.".

Publications
The editions of women publish French and foreign authors, as well as "writings of yesterday". The different collections are oriented towards the human sciences (psychoanalysis, sociology, philosophy, history), fiction, biography, correspondences, poetry, theater, narrative (testimonials, memoirs), and addresses multiple themes: the feminine condition, lesbianism, feminism, women's history ...

One of the early bestsellers was "Hosto-Blues" by Victoria Thérame and first bestseller was "On the Side of Little Girls" by Elena Gianini Belotti, translated from Italian.

Between 1974 and 1979, the writer Hélène Cixous published eight titles of fiction: Souffles; Portrait of Dora; 
Party; Angst; Wedding Preparations Beyond the Abyss; Oedipus' name, Song of the Forbidden Body; Anankè and Live Orange.

In 1993 the publisher released a photo album "Catherine Deneuve, Selected Portraits", of the actress with 28 photographers to benefit the fight against AIDS, under the editorship of Antoinette Fouque and Jean-Pierre Lavoignat for Studio Magazine.

In November 2013, the publisher issued the book Le Dictionnaire universel des créatrices, edited by Béatrice Didier, Antoinette Fouque and Mireille Calle-Gruber.

Published authors
Non-exhaustive list of authors published by women's editions:

Literary awards

Selected list of awarded works:

 Friendship Award Franco-Arab in 1982 awarded Ferdaous, a voice from hell and The Hidden Face of Eve by Nawal el Saadawi.
 Jean Macé Prize for Teaching 1982 awarded to Staboulkash of Victoria Thérame .
 Price of the Franco-Arab friendship in 1996 and prices Palestine Mahmoud Hamshari 1997 attributed to Peace to the inside. Palestine-Israel of Hanane Ashraoui.

Other publications
The Women's group also published newspapers: Women's Daily (irregular publication from November 1974 to June 1976), Women in Motion magazine monthly (December 1977 to January 1979) and weekly (101 issues with interruption, October 1979) to July 1982).

Audiobooks
In 1980, Antoinette Fouque launched a collection of audio books:

Among the famous performers who created the audiobooks, are the actors Isabelle Adjani, Fanny Ardant, Pierre Arditi, Nathalie Baye, Charles Berling, Catherine Deneuve, Gerard Depardieu, Isabelle Huppert, Jeanne Moreau, among others) and writers (Yves Bonnefoy, Jacques Derrida, Marguerite Duras, Julien Gracq, Nathalie Sarraute, and others.

Bookstore and women's gallery
The first bookstore "Women" was inaugurated in Paris on May 30, 1974 at 68 rue des Saints-Pères  which transferred to rue de Seine in 1981, where it includes an art gallery hosted by Marie Dedieu, which exhibits artists such as Sonia Delaunay, Milvia Maglione Françoise Martinelli, Kate Millett, Michele Knoblauch, Sophie Clavel, Tina Modotti , Claude Batho, Ilse Bing, Louise Nevelson, June Wayne, Popy Moreni, Mary Orensanz, Colette Alvarez-Urbajtel  This bookshop-gallery closed in 1999, and reopened in rue Jacob, accompanied by a "women's space".

In 1976, a women's bookstore was opened in Marseille, and another in Lyon in 1977, but closed thereafter.

See also
 Antoinette Fouque
 Women's Liberation Movement

Bibliography
 Annie Dizier-Metz, History of a Woman, Memory of Women, The Marguerite Durand Library, 1992.
 Sylvina Boissonnas (eds.), Women's Memory 1974-2004. For 30 years women have been publishing ... , women's edition, 2006, third edition.
 Bibia Pavard, Women's Publishing. History of the first years, 1972-1979, L'Harmattan, 2005.
 MLF Generation, Women's Issues, 2008.
 MLF generation, ed. Women, Paris, 2008, p. 160 .
 "Marie Dedieu, feminist pioneer" on Le Monde.fr (accessed February 27, 2018) [archive]
 Facsimile catalog of women's gallery 1981-1982, For thirty years women publish, ed. Women, Paris, 2004, p. 352-403.
 MLF generation, collective, ed. Women, 2008, p. 225 .
 Kate Millett, Going to Iran, photographs of Sophie Keir Coward, McCann & Geoghegan, New York, 1982; In Iran, ed. women, 1979.
 Jean Gueyras, Manifestations of women bring Ayatollah Khomeini to nuance its position on the "Islamic veil", Le Monde, March 13, 1979, p. 4.
 Dominique Pouchin, Western feminists mobilize, Le Monde, March 22, 1979, p. 6.
 Kate Millett, Going to Iran, in Iran, op. cit.
 Claudine Mulard, "Tehran, March 1979 with camera and without veil, shooting Journal," Modern Times no. 661, November–December 2010, p. 161-177.
 Mahnaz Matine, Nasser Mohajer, Iranian Women's Uprising, March 8, 1979, Noghteh Books, 2010.

References

Feminist book publishing companies
Book publishing companies of France
Publishing companies established in 1972
1972 establishments in France